is a Japanese manga written by Piroshiki and illustrated by Takana Hotaru. It follows the life of a boy who lives in a society where almost all people his age have supernatural powers called Iris in their eyes. As the only student in the school who has no Iris at all, he must make use of his intellect to help his friends see through the incidents that keep popping up.

Plot
In a world where 99% of every boy and girl has a special power called Iris, Toru, who is in the 1% as a result of not having any kind of special power from a young age, lives by his motto, "Minimal Exposure" - to live without standing out. But his peaceful school life changes when he receives a certain "confession" from the school's most popular girl, Koyuki, and his motto begins to shake.

Characters

The title character of the series, Toru is one of the few students at his school who does not have an Iris ability. He is usually ostracized by his peers and thus keeps a low profile in school. After he helps Koyuki with her situation, he begins to befriend others as he helps resolve their problems. As a child, Toru pretended to have an Iris ability to identify the Irises of his peers, but when Asahi exposed his secret, the students shunned him.

 

The heroine of the series, she is a kind and beautiful girl with the ability to discern whether someone can help her with a task by visualizing a circle or X above their head. Although she is esteemed as a school idol, she is the first to come to Toru and openly ask him out, raising suspicions and jealousy among her classmates, but actually, she wants his help to find a qualified candidate for the next student council president. When Koyuki helps her, she and the council come to the realization that she herself is the most qualified. She thanks Toru by hanging out with him as a close friend, and dragging him against his will to deal with situations only he could handle. She is one of the few people who are not bothered that Toru is an Iris Zero, and admits she is a little jealous that he can see the world without filters. She is in love with Toru even though he tries not to reciprocate for fear of tarnishing her reputation of hanging out with an Iris Zero. However, Harumi observes that they both like each other the most.

Yuki is Koyuki's friend who also used to be Toru's childhood friend until an incident where she reveals Toru's identity as an Iris Zero. Her Iris ability allows her to see when someone tells a lie, as indicated by the appearance of a devil's pointed tail. She aspires to become a police officer, but when her guidance counselor lies and says she would be good for that, she gets offended and slaps her, putting herself at risk of expulsion. After Toru saves her by explaining the situation, she is able to reconcile with the teacher and be more friendly towards Toru. Piroshiki notes that she detects just the honesty of the person, and that a person can be sincere but wrong about something and not sprout a tail, whereas a deceitful person would immediately show the tail.

 

Hijiri is Toru's classmate with a laid-back attitude, and Toru's only friend before meeting Koyuki. His Iris ability allows him to see when someone is close to death, in the form of butterflies that converge near the person: a swarm of butterflies would indicate that the person will die very soon. He and Toru become friends after he helps him protect a girl important to him by preventing her death upon exposing the person who was after her life.

 

Kuga is Toru's classmate who is introduced as a shy girl that joins Toru's group at a field trip. She is capable of evaluating other people's feelings using her Iris that allows her to see fairy-like wings on them whose colors vary according to their emotional state. Because of her ability, she sometimes acts selfishly, where she steals Koyuki's Japanese clothing, and then serves as an antagonist in the Iris Hunter story-line where she psychologically manipulates her peers into not using their Irises and has them think they lost their abilities.

 

Harumi is Toru's classmate and a calm and collected boy who wears glasses, who is Kuga's childhood friend and always looks after her. His Iris manifests itself in the form of a halo above someone's head with an arrow pointing to whomever the person likes, with its length indicating how much they like that person. During the Iris Hunter storyline, he tries to protect Kuga by redirecting the blame to Toru. He reveals that some years ago, he and Kuga made a promise to not abuse their powers, but after Kuga relapses, he saves her from killing herself. He has an animosity against Toru because he and Kuga had been helping their friend Houjou become more popular by having him run for Student Council President, only to be upended by Koyuki's sudden popularity.

Concept and development
In the afterword of volume 1, the author mentions a past idea where the protagonist could see the red strings of fate but could not fall in love. This changed to a protagonist who does not exhibit special powers among his peers who do.  He does not want to stand out for fear of being bullied but acts a bit like a detective to help his friends. In a bonus chapter, the characters comment about the lack of showing underwear in the series in comparison to other titles in the magazines. In the afterword of volume 4, the author mentions that they originally planned to just make a series of one-shots with five of the main characters sketched out, but the editor wanted to stretch it out into a series. The editor also picked the title tentatively but it stuck in the final version.

Media

Manga
The manga started serialization on 2009 but in 2012 it went on hiatus for a year and a half while Takana was hospitalized, only resuming on October, 2013. The series was continued until 2019, when it entered indefinite hiatus due to authors health issues. In June 2014, Digital Manga Publishing announced that it had added Iris Zero to its releases.

Drama CD
A drama CD has been published by Edge Records first on February 23, 2012 and the second drama CD is released along with the limited special edition of volume 6 on March 22, 2014.

Works cited
 "Ch." is shortened form for chapter and refers to a chapter number of the Iris Zero manga

References

External links
Official site 

Digital Manga Publishing titles
Drama anime and manga
Media Factory manga
Mystery anime and manga
Romance anime and manga
Seinen manga
Supernatural anime and manga